Nick Wieland (born 1988) is an American football offensive tackle for the Kiel Baltic Hurricanes of the German Football League.

Football career

Nick Wieland began playing football with the Hamburg Blue Devils. In 2009 he moved to Kiel Baltic Hurricanes.

2011 IFAF World Cup

Nick Wieland was named on the roster for the German national team for the 2011 IFAF World Cup in Austria. After the tournament, in which the Germans ranked up fifth, he was named to the all-tournament second team.

References

External links
Kiel Baltic Hurricanes bio
Germany National Team 2011 World Cup roster

1988 births
Living people
American football offensive tackles
German players of American football